Louis-Rodrigue Masson,  (baptized Louis-François-Roderick Masson) (6 November 1833 – 8 November 1903) was a Canadian Member of Parliament, Senator, and the fifth Lieutenant Governor of Quebec. He represented Terrebonne in the House of Commons of Canada from 1867 to 1882.

Life 
Masson was born in Terrebonne, Lower Canada, in 1833, the son of Joseph Masson. He studied at Georgetown College in Washington, D.C., and College of the Holy Cross in Worcester, Massachusetts. He went on to study law with George-Étienne Cartier and was called to the bar in 1859 but decided not to practice law. A Conservative, from 1878 to 1880 he served under Sir John A. Macdonald as Minister of Militia and Defence, and in 1880 he was the President of the Privy Council.

From March to October 1884, he was a member of the Legislative Council of Quebec. From 1884 to 1887, he was the Lieutenant-Governor of Quebec. He published Les bourgeois de la compagnie du Nord-Ouest (1889).New International Encyclopedia

He had been named to the Senate for Mille Isles division in 1882; he resigned his seat when he was named Lieutenant-Governor. He was reappointed to the Senate in 1890 and served until June 1903. He died later that year in Montreal, Quebec.

He was the father-in-law of Liberal MP, Emmanuel Berchmans Devlin.

Electoral record

External links
 
 
 

1833 births
1903 deaths
Canadian senators from Quebec
Conservative Party of Canada (1867–1942) MPs
Conservative Party of Canada (1867–1942) senators
Lieutenant Governors of Quebec
Members of the House of Commons of Canada from Quebec
Members of the King's Privy Council for Canada
Conservative Party of Quebec MLCs
People from Terrebonne, Quebec
French Quebecers
Canadian Militia officers